Nili-Ravi is a breed of domestic water buffalo of Punjab. It is distributed principally in Pakistan and India, concentrated in the Punjab region. It is similar to the Murrah breed of buffalo, and is reared mainly for dairy use.

References

Livestock in Punjab
Water buffalo breeds originating in India
Water buffalo breeds originating in Pakistan